Anna Livia may refer to:

Places in Ireland
 Anna Livia (monument)
 Anna Livia Bridge

People
 Anna Livia Julian Brawn
 Anna Livia Plurabelle, a character in Finnegans Wake

Radio station
 Dublin City FM, formerly known as Anna Livia FM